Surgical staples are specialized staples used in surgery in place of sutures to close skin wounds or connect or remove parts of the bowels or lungs. The use of staples over sutures reduces the local inflammatory response, width of the wound, and time it takes to close.

A more recent development, from the 1990s, uses clips instead of staples for some applications; this does not require the staple to penetrate.

History
The technique was pioneered by "father of surgical stapling", Hungarian surgeon Hümér Hültl.

The technology was refined in the 1950s in the Soviet Union, allowing for the first commercially produced re-usable stapling devices for creation of bowel and anastomeses. Mark M. Ravitch brought a sample of stapling device after attending a surgical conference in USSR, and introduced it to entrepreneur Leon C. Hirsch, who founded the United States Surgical Corporation in 1964 to manufacture surgical staplers under its Auto Suture brand. Until the late 1970s USSC had the market essentially to itself, but in 1977 Johnson & Johnson's Ethicon brand entered the market and today both are widely used, along with competitors from the Far East.  USSC was bought by Tyco Healthcare in 1998, which became Covidien on June 29, 2007.

Safety and patency of mechanical (stapled) bowel anastomoses has been widely studied.  It is generally the case in such studies that sutured anastomoses are either comparable or less prone to leakage.  It is possible that this is the result of recent advances in suture technology, along with increasingly risk-conscious surgical practice.  Certainly modern synthetic sutures are more predictable and less prone to infection than catgut, silk and linen, which were the main suture materials used up to the 1990s.

One key feature of intestinal staplers is that the edges of the stapler act as a haemostat, compressing the edges of the wound and closing blood vessels during the stapling process. Recent studies have shown that with current suturing techniques there is no significant difference in outcome between hand sutured and mechanical anastomoses (including clips), but mechanical anastomoses are significantly quicker to perform.

In patients that are subjected to pulmonary resections where lung tissue is sealed with staplers, there is often postoperative air leakage. Alternative techniques to seal lung tissue are currently investigated.

Types and applications

The first commercial staplers were made of stainless steel with titanium staples loaded into reloadable staple cartridges.

Modern surgical staplers are either disposable and made of plastic, or reusable and made of stainless steel.  Both types are generally loaded using disposable cartridges.

The staple line may be straight, curved or circular.  Circular staplers are used for end-to-end anastomosis after bowel resection or, somewhat more controversially, in esophagogastric surgery.  The instruments may be used in either open or laparoscopic surgery, different instruments are used for each application.  Laparoscopic staplers are longer, thinner, and may be articulated to allow for access from a restricted number of trocar ports.

Some staplers incorporate a knife, to complete excision and anastomosis in a single operation.  
Staplers are used to close both internal and skin wounds.  Skin staples are usually applied using a disposable stapler, and removed with a specialized staple remover.  Staplers are also used in vertical banded gastroplasty surgery (popularly known as "stomach stapling").

While devices for circular end-to-end anastomosis of digestive tract are widely used, in spite of intensive research  circular staplers for vascular anastomosis never had yet significant impact on standard hand (Carrel) suture technique. Apart from the different modality of coupling of vascular (everted) in respect to digestive (inverted) stumps, the main basic reason could be that, particularly for small vessels, the manuality and precision required just for positioning on vascular stumps and actioning any device cannot be significantly inferior to that required to carry out the standard hand suture, then making of little utility the use of any device. An exception to that however could be organ transplantation where these two phases, i.e.device positioning at the vascular stumps and device actioning, can be carried out in different time, by different surgical team, in safe conditions when the time required does not influence donor organ preservation, i.e. at the back table in cold ischemia condition for the donor organ and after native organ removal in the recipient. This is finalized to make as brief as possible the donor organ dangerous warm ischemia phase that can be contained in the couple of minutes or less necessary just to connect the device's ends and actioning the stapler.

Although most surgical staples are made of titanium, stainless steel is more often used in some skin staples and clips.  Titanium produces less reaction with the immune system and, being non-ferrous, does not interfere significantly with MRI scanners, although some imaging artifacts may result.  Synthetic absorbable (bioabsorbable) staples are also now becoming available, based on polyglycolic acid, as with many synthetic absorbable sutures.

Removal of skin staples
Where skin staples are used to seal a skin wound it will be necessary to remove the staples after an appropriate healing period, usually between 5 and 10 days, depending on the location of the wound and other factors. The skin staple remover is a small manual device which consists of a shoe or plate that is sufficiently narrow and thin to insert under the skin staple. The active part is a small blade that, when hand-pressure is exerted, pushes the staple down through a slot in the shoe, deforming the staple into an 'M' shape to facilitate its removal. In an emergency it is possible to remove staples with a pair of artery forceps.
Skin staple removers are manufactured in many shapes and forms, some disposable and some reusable.

See also
Instruments used in general surgery

References

Surgical instruments
Fasteners